Maurie (also known as Big Mo) is a 1973 American biographical drama film directed by Daniel Mann. Distributed by National General Pictures, the film covers the lives and relationship of two NBA Hall of fame basketball players, the forward Jack Twyman, and his teammate the forward Maurice Stokes.

Plot summary
The film chronicles Twyman's and Stokes's relationship from Stokes's rookie year in the NBA up until his death. Stokes and Twyman were teammates on the Rochester Royals during the 1950s (during which time the team located to Cincinnati). Stokes fell ill three days after the last game of the 1957–58 NBA season, in Minneapolis. Stokes drove to the basket, drew contact and fell to the floor, hit his head, and was knocked unconscious. He was revived with smelling salts, and he returned to the game.

Three days later, after an opening-round playoff game against the Detroit Pistons, Stokes became ill during the team's flight back to Cincinnati, suffered a seizure and fell into a coma to awaken in a Cincinnati hospital three weeks later. Stokes never fully recovered from the brain injury, and he was left permanently paralyzed. He would be confined to bed or a wheelchair as an almost completely paralyzed quadraplegic, and would need constant nursing care.

Twyman offered his friendship and continuous moral support and financial aid to Stokes and his family (even legally adopting him). Stokes died from a heart attack in 1970.

Cast
The film starred then-newcomer actor Bernie Casey (a former NFL player) as Stokes, and the Swedish actor Bo Svenson as Twyman.

Supporting cast
The cast included actors Bill Walker and Maidie Norman as Maurice's parents; Janet MacLachlan played Stokes's college girlfriend, Dorothy (Stokes was carrying a diamond ring in his pocket, all set to propose to her, when he had the seizure on the plane); and actor Ji-Tu Cumbuka portrayed Oscar Robertson.

Music
The song "Winners", composed by Joe Raposo was performed by African-American singer Arthur Prysock . In October 1973, Frank Sinatra included a version of the song on his LP "Ol' Blue Eyes Is Back!"

Reception

Critical response
Film critic A. H. Weiler of The New York Times wrote in his review: "As a potentially inspirational saga that respects the awesome truth that generated it, Maurie, now at Loews State and Cine Theaters is, unfortunately, rarely moving as drama. The heroism, tragedy and friendship of Maurice Stokes, the black basketball star destined to die, and his white teammate, Jack Twyman, formerly of the Cincinnati Royals, evolves on screen with largely soap-opera effects."

See also
Brian's Song
 List of American films of 1973

References

External links
 
 

1970s biographical drama films
1973 films
American biographical drama films
American independent films
American basketball films
Films directed by Daniel Mann
Films scored by Joe Raposo
Biographical films about sportspeople
Cultural depictions of basketball players
1973 drama films
1970s English-language films
1970s American films